Prospect Hill Historic District is a national historic district located at Bloomington, Monroe County, Indiana.  The district encompasses 38 contributing buildings and 8 contributing structures in a predominantly residential section of Bloomington.  It developed between about 1840 and 1936, and includes notable examples of Queen Anne, Colonial Revival, Tudor Revival, Mission Revival, and Bungalow/American Craftsman style architecture.  Located in the district is the separately listed Blair-Dunning House.

It was listed on the National Register of Historic Places in 1991.

References

Historic districts on the National Register of Historic Places in Indiana
Bungalow architecture in Indiana
Queen Anne architecture in Indiana
Colonial Revival architecture in Indiana
Tudor Revival architecture in Indiana
Mission Revival architecture in Indiana
Buildings and structures in Bloomington, Indiana
Historic districts in Monroe County, Indiana
National Register of Historic Places in Monroe County, Indiana